Saleh Wreikat ( – 22 May 2014) was a Jordanian politician. He served as a member of the 16th House of Representatives for the 5th District of Amman.

In March 2011, during a vote of confidence, he supported Prime Minister Marouf al-Bakhit.

During his time in the House of Representatives he was head of the House Water and Agriculture Committee. Wreikat supported the right of an own state for Palestinians.

Wreikat died on 22 May 2014, aged 74.

References

1930s births
2014 deaths
Members of the House of Representatives (Jordan)
Year of birth uncertain